Boğsak is a Mediterranean islet in Mersin Province, Turkey.

Geography
Administratively  it is a part of İmamuşağı village of Silifke district of Mersin Province.

History
Although there is no settlement on the islet, it was inhabited in the late antiquity. Stadiasmus Maris Magni of the second half of the 3rd century  mentions the λιμὴν Νησούλιον (harbor, of the small island) According to an inscription of the 6th century the name of the settlement on the islet was as Άστερήα and it was probably a wealthy village, ruins of which are partially preserved .

Boğsak Bay
Boğsak bay is a bay on Mediterranean coast facing east (i.e., Baoğsak islet) There are some summer houses and hotels on the bay. In the bay and around the island the popular sports activity is diving

References

External links
 Boğsak Bay

Islands of Turkey
Islands of Mersin Province
Silifke District
Mediterranean islands